Krzczonów  is a village in Lublin County, Lublin Voivodeship, in eastern Poland. It is the seat of the gmina (administrative district) called Gmina Krzczonów.

Notable people
 Wojciech Siemion, Polish actor

References

External links
 

Villages in Lublin County
Lublin Governorate
Lublin Voivodeship (1919–1939)